Crown Mountain, sometimes called Ellison Peak, is a mountain located in Strathcona Provincial Park on Vancouver Island in British Columbia.

History
The mountain has historic significance in British Columbia.  It formed one corner of the large land grant given to Robert Dunsmuir  to fund construction of the E&N Railway.  A segment of the boundary of that grant later became a boundary of Strathcona Provincial Park.  When BC Premier Sir Richard McBride set aside a reserve for the park, his Minister of Lands, Price Ellison, lead an expedition to explore the new park reserve which included the first ascent of Crown Mountain on July 29, 1910.  The crew included Ellison's 20-year-old daughter, Myra King Ellison, who was first to set foot on the peak, as well as Colonel William Holmes, J. Twaddle, A.L. Hudson, Harry McClure Johnson (a cousin of Myra's), Charles Haslam, James Hasworth and Frank Ward.

References

External links
Strathcona Provincial Park from British Columbia Ministry of Environment website.

One-thousanders of British Columbia
Vancouver Island Ranges
Nootka Land District